I'll Never Forget What's 'Isname (title on the original British posters and on the DVD cover) or I'LL NEVER FORGET WHAT'S 'iSNAME (title on the original print, trailer and soundtrack album) is a 1967 British comedy-drama film directed and produced by Michael Winner. It stars Oliver Reed and Orson Welles. The film deals with creativity and commercialism.

Plot
The opening credits run as a man carries a large axe through the streets of London. He then enters an office and destroys a desk with the axe. The man, Quint (Oliver Reed) works for Dallafield Advertising alongside Lute (Orson Welles). Quint has a string of affairs with younger women despite being married. He begins to recall his torturous school days, and these memories entwine with the present.

Quint attempts to get back at his boss Jonathan Lute by making a negative commercial reusing themes from earlier in the film, including Lute saying "The number one product of all human endeavor is waste... waste." The commercial, advertising a Super-8 camera, talks about capturing events while you still can before everything is destroyed and discarded. It ends with Quint operating a car crusher and destroying numerous cameras. The commercial is hailed as a masterpiece, and wins an award, but Quint hurls the award into the River Thames, and escapes into Swinging London.

Cast

Soundtrack 
The soundtrack by Francis Lai was released on LP by Decca Records.

Reception 
The film received generally positive reviews.

Controversy 
In the United States, the film was denied a MPAA seal of approval due to a scene between Oliver Reed and Carol White which supposedly implied cunnilingus. Winner, in his audio commentary, said he considered the scene to show masturbation. The Catholic League inaccurately described it as "fellatio". Universal distributed the film through a subsidiary that was not a member of the MPAA. Along with a similar scene in Charlie Bubbles (1967), this helped to bring about the end of the Production Code in the US and its replacement with a ratings system.

The film has been incorrectly named as the first mainstream film to propose the use in the dialogue of fuck. In fact, the BBFC certified the film after demanding the removal, or at least obscuring, of the word fucking (via the sound of a car horn) in June 1967, three months later than Ulysses, which suffered heavier cuts. The error seems to have arisen because of a longstanding lack of easily obtainable film release date information.

References

External links 
 
 

1967 films
1967 comedy films
British comedy films
British satirical films
1960s English-language films
Films about advertising
Films directed by Michael Winner
Films set in London
Films scored by Francis Lai
Films produced by Michael Winner
Adultery in films
1960s British films